The Western Aryanic languages are a branch of the Aryanic languages, attested from the time of Old Persian (6th century BC) and Median.

Languages
The traditional Northwestern branch is a convention for non-Southwestern languages, rather than a genetic group. The languages are as follows:

Old Iranian period 
 Southwest: Old Persian†, etc.
 Northwest: Median†, etc.

Middle Iranian period 
 Southwest: Middle Persian†, etc
 Northwest: Parthian†, etc.

Modern period (Neo-Iranian) 

 Northwestern Iranian
 Balochi (incl. Koroshi)
 Caspian
 Gilaki (incl. Rudbari, Taleqani)
 Mazandarani (incl. Tabari, Shahmirzadi)
 Gorgani†
Semnani
 Semnani
 Sangisari
 Lasgerdi-Sorkhei (incl. Aftari)
 Kurdic (acc. Anonby)
 Kurdish
 Northern Kurdish (Kurmanji)
 Central Kurdish (Sorani)
 Southern Kurdish (incl. Laki and Kurdali)
Zaza-Gorani
Zazaki
 Gorani (incl. Hawrami, Sarli, Shabaki, Bajalani)
 Adharic
Old Adhari†
 Tatic
Talysh (north-central)
Gozarkhani (Alamuti)
North: Harzandi, Karingani (Kalasuri, Khoynarudi)
Kho'ini
South
Alviri-Vidari (Alviri, Vidari)
Ashtiani (Amora’i, Kahaki, Tafreshi), Vafsi
Razajerdi, Eshtehardi, Takestani (Ramandi, Kharaqani)
Central
Khalkhalic: Kajali, Koresh-e Rostam (Karani), Shahrudi (incl. southern Talysh)
Maraghei
Upper Taromi, Kabatei
Khuri (Kavir)
Central Plateau
 Sivandi
 Judeo-Hamadani, Judeo-Borujerdi
 NW = Khunsari (Judeo-Khunsari, Judeo-Khomeini, Vanishani, Mahallati, Vanishani, Judeo-Golpaygani, etc.)
 NE = Kashanic: Soi (incl. Abuzaydabadi), Natanzi
 SW = Gazi (many dialects)
 Southeastern:  Zoroastrian Dari (Zoroastrian Yazdi, Judeo-Kermani), Nayini

 Southwestern Iranian(Aryan)
Bashkardi (Southern Bashkardi)
Garmsiri (Northern Bashkardi, Bandari, Minabi/Minowi–Hormozi: Hormozgan)
Kumzari
Achomi (Larestani)
Caucasian Tat (SW Tat): Tat, Judeo-Tat
Persian (dialects: Iranian Persian & Judeo-Persian, Dari (incl. Madaglashti), Tajik & Judeo-Bukharic, Hazaragi, Aimaq, Sistani, Pahlavani Persian†)
 Persid
 Shushtari–Dezfuli
 Luri (incl. Bakhtiari)
 Kuhmareyi (incl. Davani)
 (see also Persid dialects of Khuzestan)
 Fars (numerous SW Fars dialects: Heshnizi, Gavbandi, Dashtini, Kangani, Jami, Bardesuni (Bardestani), Khenesiri, Bordekhuni, Dashtiyati (Dashti), Tangesiri (incl. Delvari), Khormuji, Khayizi, Ahrami, Bushehri, Bandar Rig (Fars of Bandar Rig), Genaveyi, Deylami (Liravi)†, Dashtesuni (Dashtestani), Judeo-Shirazi, etc.)

There is also a recently described, and as yet unclassified, Batu'i language that is presumably Western Iranian. Extinct Deilami is sometimes classified in the Caspian branch.
An Iranian Khalaj language has been claimed, but does not exist; the Khalaj speak a Turkic language.

Many of the languages and dialects spoken in Markazi and Isfahan provinces are giving way to Persian in the younger generations.

It is to note that the Caspian languages (incl. Adharic), the central dialects, and the Zaza-Gorani languages are likely descended from a later form of Median with varying amounts of Parthian substrata, whereas the Semnani languages were likely descended from Parthian.

See also
 Eastern Aryan languages

References

Bibliography
 Pierre Lecoq.  1989.  "Les dialectes caspiens et les dialectes du nord-ouest de l'Iran," Compendium Linguarum Iranicarum, ed. Rüdiger Schmitt. Wiesbaden: L. Reichert Verlag, 1989;  p. 99.

Further reading

Hanaway Jr, William L. "Persian and West Iranic: History and State of Research: Part One: Persian Grammar.[Trends in Linguistics: State-of-the-Art Reports, No. 12]." (1982): 56-58.